The flappet lark (Mirafra rufocinnamomea) is a species of lark in the family Alaudidae, widespread across Sub-Saharan Africa. The name flappet originates from the distinctive wing flapping sound made during its breeding season.

Taxonomy and systematics
The flappet lark and the Cape clapper lark are regarded as forming a superspecies with the Eastern clapper lark. The alternate name "cinnamon bush lark" is also an alternate name for Horsfield's bush lark.

Subspecies 
Fifteen subspecies are recognized: 
 Buckley's lark or West African cinnamon bush-lark, M. r. buckleyi (Shelley, 1873): Originally described as a separate species in the genus Calandrella. Found from southern Mauritania and Senegal to northern Cameroon
 M. r. serlei White, CMN, 1960: Found in south-eastern Nigeria
 Ubangi cinnamon lark, M. r. tigrina Oustalet, 1892: Originally described as a separate species. Found from eastern Cameroon to northern Democratic Republic of Congo
 Darfur flappet lark, M. r. furensis Lynes, 1923: Found in west-central Sudan
 Sobat flappet lark, M. r. sobatensis Lynes, 1914: Originally described as a separate species. Found in central Sudan
 M. r. rufocinnamomea (Salvadori, 1865): Found in north-western and central Ethiopia
 Abyssinian flappet lark, M. r. omoensis Neumann, 1928: Found in south-western Ethiopia
 M. r. torrida Shelley, 1882: Found from south-eastern Sudan and northern Ethiopia to northern Uganda, central Kenya and central Tanzania
 Rwenzori flappet lark, M. r. kawirondensis van Someren, 1921: Found in eastern Democratic Republic of Congo, western Uganda and western Kenya
 Nyasaland flappet lark, M. r. fischeri (Reichenow, 1878):  Originally described as a separate species. Found in Angola, southern Democratic Republic of Congo, northern Zambia and northern Mozambique north through eastern Tanzania, eastern Kenya to southern Somalia
 M. r. schoutedeni White, CMN, 1956: Found in Gabon and Central African Republic to western Democratic Republic of Congo and north-western Angola
 M. r. lwenarum White, CMN, 1945: Found in north-western Zambia
 M. r. smithersi White, CMN, 1956: Found in northern Zambia, Zimbabwe, north-eastern Botswana and northern South Africa
 M. r. pintoi White, CMN, 1956: Found in southern Mozambique, Eswatini and north-eastern South Africa
 M. r. mababiensis (Roberts, 1932): Found in western Zambia to central Botswana

Distribution and habitat 
The flappet lark has a large range covering much of the African continent with an estimated global extent of occurrence of 10,000,000 km2. Its natural habitats are dry savannah, moist savannah, and subtropical or tropical dry lowland grassland.

References

External links 

Species factsheet - BirdLife International
Species text - The Atlas of Southern African Birds

flappet lark
Birds of Sub-Saharan Africa
flapper lark
Taxonomy articles created by Polbot